Yass River is a locality in the area of the Yass Valley Council, in New South Wales, Australia. It lies on both sides of both the Yass River to the northeast of Murrumbateman and the northwest of Gundaroo. It is about 40 km north of Canberra.

References

Yass Valley Council
Localities in New South Wales